Polina Sergeyevna Shelepen (born 28 July 1995) is a figure skater. She is a two-time (2009, 2011) JGP Final silver medalist and a two-time (2011, 2012) Russian national junior silver medalist. She competed for Russia through 2012.

Personal life 
Polina Shelepen was born 28 July 1995 in Moscow, Russia.

Career 

Shelepen began skating at the age of four-and-a-half, instructed by her first coach Eteri Tutberidze. She learned her first triple, a Salchow, at eleven years old and would later attempt a quadruple Salchow in practice. In 2011, she told an interviewer that her mother took her to the rink because she "didn't like to go to kindergarten because there everyone had to eat a cream of wheat".

In the 2009–10 season, Shelepen won her two Junior Grand Prix assignments and qualified for the 2009–10 Junior Grand Prix Final where she won silver. She then competed at the 2010 World Junior Championships and finished 4th.

Ahead of the 2010-11 season, Shelepen grew ten cm, resulting in some coordination problems. She won gold at the JGP in France, bronze in the Czech Republic, and finished 5th at the 2010 Junior Grand Prix Final. At the 2011 Russian Championships, Shelepen finished 7th on the senior level and won silver on the junior level. She finished 7th at the 2011 World Junior Championships.

In the 2011–12 season, Shelepen continued on the Junior Grand Prix, winning events in Latvia and Romania to qualify for the 2011–12 Junior Grand Prix Final. She won the silver medal at the Final. At the 2012 Russian Championships, she finished 10th on the senior level and won another silver medal on the junior level. Originally the first alternate for the 2012 World Junior Championships, Shelepen was named to replace Elizaveta Tuktamysheva, who withdrew from the competition. At the event, Shelepen ranked 12th in the short program and 4th in the free skate, finishing 6th overall.

In July 2012, Shelepen parted ways from her long-time coach Eteri Tutberidze and began training at the CSKA Moscow ice rink with Svetlana Sokolovskaya. She finished 5th at the 2012 Nebelhorn Trophy and 10th at her first senior Grand Prix assignment, the 2012 Skate Canada. In November, Shelepen withdrew from the 2012 NHK Trophy due to worsening of a long-standing ankle injury. She resumed training in December and competed at the 2012 Golden Spin of Zagreb, finishing 5th. She later withdrew from the 2013 Russian Championships.

On March 23, 2013, Sokolovskaya confirmed that Shelepen had received her Israeli passport and wished to compete for Israel. The Russian skating federation released Shelepen in May 2013. Before she may compete internationally, the International Skating Union requires that she sit out a certain period of time according to the rules for single skaters.

On September 16, 2014, Shelepen announced that she had decided to retire from competitive figure skating and had moved back to Moscow after living in Israel for a year to acquire Israeli citizenship. She stated that the reason for her decision was due to an ankle injury she had been plagued with during the 2012-2013 season and Shelepen had to undergo surgery during her time in Israel. After returning to Russia, Shelepen began coaching younger skaters at the CSKA Moscow with her coach, Svetlana Sokolovskaya, and said that she plans to enroll in the Russian State University of Physical Education to get a license for professional coaching.

Programs

Competitive highlights 

GP: Grand Prix; JGP: Junior Grand Prix

Detailed results 

(Small medals for short and free programs awarded only at ISU Championships.)

References

External links 

 
 Polina Shelepen at fskate.ru 

Russian female single skaters
1995 births
Living people
Figure skaters from Moscow